Sukhan Faiz (born 9 March 1988) is a Pakistani former cricketer who played primarily as a right-handed batter. She appeared in two One Day Internationals for Pakistan, both at the 2009 Women's Cricket World Cup. She played domestic cricket for Multan, Pakistan Universities, Khyber Pakhtunkhwa, Higher Education Commission and Balochistan.

References

External links
 
 

Living people
1988 births
Cricketers from Multan
Punjabi people
Pakistani women cricketers
Pakistan women One Day International cricketers
Multan women cricketers
Pakistan Universities women cricketers
Khyber Pakhtunkhwa women cricketers
Higher Education Commission women cricketers
Baluchistan women cricketers